Debra Jo Rupp (born February 24, 1951) is an American actress best known for her roles as Kitty Forman on the Fox sitcom That '70s Show and its sequel series That '90s Show, and Alice Knight-Buffay on the third through fifth seasons of Friends. She voiced Mary Lou Helperman in the animated series Teacher's Pet and its sequel film, and played timid secretary Miss Patterson in Big (1988).

In 2012, Rupp starred as sex therapist Dr. Ruth Westheimer in Dr. Ruth – All the Way on the St. Germain Stage of the Barrington Stage Company. Rupp reprised the role Off-Broadway in Becoming Dr. Ruth, for which she was nominated for the 2014 Drama Desk Award for Outstanding Solo Performance.

Early life and education
Rupp was raised in Boxford, Massachusetts, where she attended Masconomet Regional High School, graduating in 1969. She has two sisters Robin Lee Rupp and Rebecca Louise Rupp. 

Rupp always dreamed of being an actress, but her parents were firmly opposed to the idea. They sent her to the University of Rochester in New York because it offered no theater classes, but the school added a drama department in Rupp's freshman year. On campus, she was an active member of Drama House, a small theater club and venue. After graduating with a B.A. in 1974, she moved to New York to begin her acting career.

Career

1980s
Rupp left Massachusetts in 1979 to pursue an acting career in New York City. She frequently performed on stage and appeared in commercials before winning her first television role in 1980 as Sheila, a topless dancer, on the daytime drama All My Children. Earlier the same year, Rupp played Helen, the wife of a cheating husband, in Sharon Tipsword's one-act comedy Second Verse, produced as part of a play festival at New York's Nat Horne Theater.

Another notable stage performance was as the young bride Eleanor in the 1985 production of A. R. Gurney's The Middle Ages at the Whole Theater Company, established by Olympia Dukakis in Montclair, New Jersey.

She garnered praise from Walter Goodman in a New York Times review of one of her many off-Broadway performances: as June Yeager, a young wife who feels she is never "loved enough", in the 1986 York Theater Company production of Arthur Laurents' dramatic play, The Time of the Cuckoo staged at the Church of the Heavenly Rest in New York City's Upper East Side.

Rupp's list of stage credits includes appearances in Terrence McNally's Frankie and Johnny in the Clair de Lune and Cynthia Heimel's A Girl's Guide to Chaos, the Broadway role which propelled her career forward. She originated the role of Cynthia in 1986, a character based on Heimel's observations made during her stints as a columnist for Playboy and The Village Voice. Directed by Wynn Handman, and sharing the stage with Rita Jenrette, Rupp's performance as Cynthia was immortalized by legendary caricaturist Al Hirschfeld and described in a New York Times review as "an appealing mixture of pluck and pathos". In his review of Chaos, New York Newsday theater critic Allan Wallach called Rupp "a real find".

In early 1987, Rupp was featured in an article written by Enid Nemy for the "Broadway" section of The New York Times. Entitled "New York is beckoning, but first, Los Angeles", the interview revealed how Rupp's success in the theater so soon after her arrival in New York City had scared the young actress enough to take time off from acting for several years. After returning to the stage, Rupp explained, she was often cast as an ingénue, but after her portrayal of Cynthia in Chaos, she began getting calls to audition in Los Angeles for "really crazy neurotic" parts in television pilots. She was realistic about the unpredictability of an acting career, and since she had promised her mother she would never wait tables when she left for New York, she had not given up her part-time work as a bookkeeper and was "learning computers" as something to fall back on.

Rupp continued to devote herself to acting full-time through the 1980s, and performed in numerous regional stage productions. One such production was Sherry Kramer's Wall of Water in New Haven, Connecticut, at the Yale Repertory Theatre's Winterfest play festival of 1988. She guest-starred on numerous television shows, including Kate & Allie, Spenser for Hire, and The Days and Nights of Molly Dodd. In 1988, Rupp landed her first feature-film role as Miss Patterson, the timid secretary of Tom Hanks' Josh Baskin, in the comedy Big.

1990s
In 1990, Rupp returned to New York City to perform in a Broadway stage production of Cat on a Hot Tin Roof with Kathleen Turner at the Eugene O'Neill Theatre. In it, Rupp portrayed Mae (Sister Woman). Her television work during the early 1990s included recurring roles as Ms. Higgins on the television series Davis Rules with Randy Quaid, and as Sister Mary Incarnata on Phenom with Judith Light, as well as guest roles on Blossom, Family Matters, L.A. Law, and ER.

In 1995, she began her stint as Jeff Foxworthy's sister-in-law Gayle on The Jeff Foxworthy Show, appeared in the science fiction miniseries The Invaders with Scott Bakula, portrayed Jerry Seinfeld's eccentric booking agent Katie on an episode of Seinfeld (a role she reprised in 1996), and performed on stage as Meg in Broken Bones, a dark drama about spousal abuse by Drew McWeeny and Scott Swan, as part of a one-act play festival at Hollywood's Met Theater. She provided the voice of Lana Lionheart in the "MGM Sing-Alongs" Videos in 1997. Also in 1997, Rupp appeared as the office manager in the 1997 independent film Clockwatchers, co-starring Lisa Kudrow, Parker Posey, and Toni Colette.

Rupp appeared in several episodes of Friends as Alice Knight, a home economics teacher who fell in love with and married Phoebe Buffay's (Lisa Kudrow) much younger half-brother, Frank Jr. (Giovanni Ribisi). In 1998, she began portraying Kitty Forman in the comedy series, That '70s Show. She also portrayed Marilyn See, wife of astronaut Elliot See, in episode 11 of the Emmy Award-winning television miniseries From the Earth to the Moon, produced by Tom Hanks and directed by Sally Field.

2000s
She lent her voice as  the character of Mrs. Helperman in Disney's animated series Teacher's Pet in 2000, and again for the 2004 movie version. She starred as a stand-up comic with a secret in the independent short film The Act, directed by Susan Kraker and Pi Ware, an official selection at the Sundance Film Festival which won several awards at film festivals around the world. In 2004, she played Brad Hunt's nagging mother in Lucky 13, a full-length independent film starring Lauren Graham. She returned to All My Children for one episode in December 2005, playing a homeless woman named Victoria. 

Rupp has often returned to Massachusetts and New York to appear in regional and off-Broadway stage productions. In 2004, she played Dotty Otley in Michael Frayn's Noises Off at the Cape Playhouse in Dennis, Massachusetts. In 2006, she appeared on stage in Pittsfield, Massachusetts, as a kooky mother in French playwright Jean Anouilh's comedy Ring Round the Moon at Barrington Stage Company.

New York theater-goers saw Rupp return to the off-Broadway stage in June 2007 as Valerie in the Second Stage Theatre production of Marisa Wegrzyn's The Butcher of Baraboo, directed by Judith Ivey. Two months later, she performed in the Berkshire Theatre Festival in Stockbridge, Massachusetts, as Ida Bolton in a revival of Paul Osborn's 1939 play, Morning's at Seven.

After That '70s Show ended in 2006, Rupp appeared in a dramatic television role as the wife of a murdered pharmaceutical CEO on the crime drama Law & Order: Special Victims Unit. In the episode, entitled "Infiltrated", Rupp's character desperately attempts to hide her slain husband's past sexual abuses. In early 2007, the feature film Kickin It Old Skool was released, in which Rupp was cast as Jamie Kennedy's mother. In 2008, she appeared as a restaurant owner who helps two homeless men in the comedy-drama-musical, Jackson, written and directed by J. F. Lawton. In the same year, she returned to daytime television in a guest role on As the World Turns.

Massachusetts theater-goers saw Rupp onstage in 2008 playing Olympia in Georges Feydeau's 1907 farce A Flea in Her Ear at the Williamstown Theatre Festival in Williamstown, and as Miss Maudie in To Kill a Mockingbird at the Barrington Stage Company in Pittsfield. In 2012, Rupp portrayed Ruth in She Wants Me, an independent romantic comedy.

2010s-present
In June and July 2012, Rupp starred as Dr. Ruth Westheimer in Dr. Ruth – All the Way on the St. Germain Stage of the Barrington Stage Company. The play showcased a sex therapist's life, from fleeing the Nazis in the Kindertransport and joining the Haganah in Jerusalem as a scout and sniper, to her struggles to succeed as a single mother coming to America. Rupp reprised the role Off-Broadway in Becoming Dr. Ruth, for which she was nominated for the 2014 Drama Desk Award for Outstanding Solo Performance.

In 2021, Rupp joined the limited television series WandaVision as Mrs. Hart, Wanda and Vision's neighbor, and will reprise her role in the spin-off series, Agatha: Coven of Chaos.

That '90s Show, a spin-off from That '70s Show, saw Rupp return as Kitty Forman. The first series was filmed in 2022 and released in early 2023.

Personal life
She has two homes, one in Lee, Massachusetts, where she stays when she is doing theatrical projects in New York, and another one in Los Angeles, where she stays during television and film projects. She said in an interview that she is a Methodist.

Stage

Filmography

Film

Television

References

External links
 
 
 Profile of Debra Jo Rupp at Variety.com
 The Act starring Debra Jo Rupp online in its entirety (approx. 9 minutes) at the Internet Movie Database
Instagram Account

Actresses from Massachusetts
American film actresses
American soap opera actresses
American stage actresses
American television actresses
Living people
People from Boxford, Massachusetts
University of Rochester alumni
American Methodists
20th-century American actresses
21st-century American actresses
Masconomet Regional High School alumni
Year of birth missing (living people)